Chlorotabanus is a genus of horse flies in the family Tabanidae.

Species
Chlorotabanus crepuscularis Bequaert, 1926
Chlorotabanus fairchildi Wilkerson, 1979
Chlorotabanus falsiflagellatus Krolow & Henriques, 2010
Chlorotabanus flagellatus Krolow & Henriques, 2009
Chlorotabanus inanis (Fabricius, 1787)
Chlorotabanus leucochlorus Fairchild, 1961
Chlorotabanus leuconotus Krolow & Henriques, 2010
Chlorotabanus mexicanus (Linnaeus, 1758)
Chlorotabanus microceratus Krolow & Henriques, 2010
Chlorotabanus ochreus Philip & Fairchild, 1956
Chlorotabanus parviceps (Kröber, 1934)

References

Tabanidae
Brachycera genera
Diptera of South America
Diptera of North America
Taxa named by Adolfo Lutz